Two royal yachts of the British monarchy have been named HMY Royal Caroline:

She was employed as a royal yacht, and was eventually converted to this role and renamed Carolina in 1716. She was rebuilt in 1733 and renamed Royal Caroline, before reverting to Peregrine Galley in 1749. She foundered in the Atlantic in 1762. 
  was launched in 1750, renamed  HMY Royal Charlotte in 1761, and was broken up in 1820.

Royal Navy ship names